Staut is a Norwegian rock, folk and pop band from Valdres, Oppland that was founded in 2009 with efforts of songwriter Ørnulf Juvkam Dyve using many times the local dialect with Gaute Ausrød as band vocalist. The 6-member band performs a mixed version of rock, folk, pop and country owing to the varied origins of its members. The band has released six albums to date, Staut in 2010 heavily touring in 2011 for its promotion and the follow-up album Eigarlaus in 2012 reaching number 2 in the Norwegian Albums Chart, Stugureint in 2013 that peaked at number 1 in its first week of release, St. Peppersby in 2014, Ja in 2017 and Makalaus in 2019.

Members
Gaute Ausrød—vocals, guitar
Ørnulf Juvkam Dyve—lyricist, composer, keyboards
Dag Arve Sandnes—guitar, mandolin
Asle Tronrud—fiddle
Torgeir Bolstad—double bass
Frode Flatland—drums

Discography

Albums

Singles
2010: "Sjå sole"
2015 "Feberheit"

References

External links
Official website

Norwegian musical groups